Complement C2 is a protein that in humans is encoded by the C2 gene. The protein encoded by this gene is part of the classical pathway of the complement system, acting as a multi-domain serine protease. Deficiency of C2 has been associated with certain autoimmune diseases.

Function 
In the classical and lectin pathways of complement activation, formation of the C3-convertase and C5-convertases requires binding of C2 to an activated surface-bound C4b in the presence of Mg2+; the resultant C4bC2 complex is cleaved by C1s or MASP2 into C2a and C2b. It is thought that cleavage of C2 by C1s, while bound to C4b, results in a conformational rotation of C2b whereas the released C2a fragment may retain most of its original structure.

C2b is the smallest , enzymatically active, fragment of C3 convertase in this pathway, C4b2b (NB: some sources now refer to the larger fragment of C2 as C2b, making the C3 convertase C4b2b, whereas older sources refer to the larger fragment of C2 as C2a, making the C3 convertase C4b2a). The smaller fragment, C2a (or C2b, depending on the source) is released into the fluid phase.

References

Further reading

External links 
 

Complement system